The following is a list of Egyptian music composers.

Pioneers

According to the work of the Egyptian musicologist Samha El-Kholy, the first generation of Egyptians to begin writing in modern Egyptian classical style were born around the turn of the 20th century.

Among the most celebrated composers in Egyptian history who lived in the 20th century are Sayed Darwish, Mohamed El Qasabgi, Baligh Hamdi, Mohamed Fawzi, Zakariya Ahmad, Mohamed Abdel Wahab, Riad El Sunbati and many others.

First generation
Sayed Darwish (1892–1923)
Mohamed El Qasabgi (1892–1966)
 Zakariya Ahmad (1896–1961)
 Yusef Greiss (1899–1961)
 Abu Bakr Khairat (1910–1963)
 Hasan Rashid (1896–1969)
 Aziz El-Shawan (1916–1993)
 Dawood Hosni (1870–1937)

Second generation
Mohamed Abdel Wahab (1902–1991)
Riad El Sunbati (1906–1981)
 Farid al-Atrash (1910–1974)
 Kamel El-Remali (b. 1922),
 Awatef Abdel Karim (1931–2021)
 Gamal Abdel-Rahim (1924–1988)
 Sayed Awad (1926–2000)
 Halim El-Dabh (1921–2017)
 Aziz El-Shawan (1916–1993)
 Soliman Gamil (1924–1994)
 Rifaat Garrana (born 1924)
 Tarek Ali Hassan (born 1937)
 Ezz Eddin Hosni (1927–2013)

Third generation
 Baligh Hamdi (1932–1993)
 Rageh Daoud (born 1954)
 Omar Khayrat (born 1949)
 Mona Ghoneim (born 1955)
 Sherif Nour (born 1958)
 Mohamed Abdelwahab Abdelfattah (born 1962)
 Sherif Mohie El Din (born 1964)
 Ali Osman (1958–2017)
 Adel Kamel (1942–2003)

Fourth generation
 Hesham Nazih (born 1972)

See also
 Opera in Arabic

References

 Castelo-Branco, Salwa El-Shawan (2001). "Egypt: Western Music." In The New Grove Dictionary of Music and Musicians, 2nd ed.
 El-Kholy, Samha (1992). Al-qawmiyya fī mūsīqā al-qarn al-‘ishrīn’ (Nationalism in 20th-century music). Kuwait: World of Knowledge.
 El-Kholy, Samha, and John O. Robison, eds. (1993). Festschrift for Gamal Abdel-Rahim. The Occasional Paper Series, v. 2, no. 2. Cairo: The Binational Fulbright Commission in Egypt.
 El-Kholy, Samha, ed. (1999). Al-ta'lif al-masri al mu'asir (Contemporary Egyptian Composition). Cairo.
 El-Shawan, Salwa (1985). "Western Music and Its Practitioners in Egypt (ca. 1825–1985): The Integration of a New Musical Tradition in a Changing Environment." Asian Music, v. 17, no. 1 (1985), pp. 145–153.
 Shehab, Yaz (1996). "Contemporary Egyptian Music." D.M.A. dissertation. Urbana: University of Illinois.

 
Egyptian
Composers
Egyptian Composers